Joshua Redman is a 1993 album by American jazz saxophonist Joshua Redman. This is his debut studio album as a leader.

Recording
The album was recorded at Skyline Studios, NYC on September 15, 1992. Track 3 was recorded live to Two-Track at Power Station, NYC on June 4, 1992. Track 6 was recorded live to Two-Track at Power Station, NYC on May 27, 1992.

Track listing
 "Blues on Sunday" (Joshua Redman)
 "Wish" (Joshua Redman)
 "Trinkle Tinkle" (Thelonious Monk)
 "Echoes" (Joshua Redman)
 "I Got You (I Feel Good)" (James Brown)
 "Body & Soul" (Edward Heyman, Frank Eyton, Robert Sour, John W. Green)
 "Tribalism" (Joshua Redman)
 "Groove X (By Any Means Necessary)" (Joshua Redman)
 "Salt Peanuts" (Dizzy Gillespie)
 "On the Sunny Side of the Street" (Jimmy McHugh, Dorothy Fields)
 "Sublimation" (Joshua Redman)

Personnel
 Joshua Redman – tenor saxophone
 Kevin Hays – piano
 Christian McBride – double bass
 Gregory Hutchinson – drums
 Clarence Penn – drums (track 3 only)
 Mike LeDonne – piano (track 6 only)
 Paul LaDuca – double bass (track 6 only) 
 Kenny Washington – drums (track 6 only)

Chart performance

References

External links
 

Joshua Redman albums
1993 albums